Générac is a commune in the Gard department in southern France. Générac station has rail connections to Nîmes and Le Grau-du-Roi. Tenor Eustase Thomas-Salignac (1867–1943) was born in Générac.

Population

See also
Communes of the Gard department
 Costières de Nîmes AOC

References

Communes of Gard